The term Great Genoa refers to the present area of the municipality of Genoa, in the north west of Italy. Great Genoa extends for over 30 km along the coast of Ligurian Sea from Nervi to Voltri, and up the Polcevera valley of the Polcevera river and the Bisagno river valley of the Bisagno river.

Great Genoa dates from 1926, when 19 municipalities were added to the six municipalities incorporated in 1874.

This aggregation makes Genoa a polycentric city, as the Genoese urban area is made up of several towns each with a strong sense of belonging, a consolidated economic and social structure and an old town, so they are not perceived as "suburbs". Reflecting the strong local identity the inhabitants of many neighborhoods, former municipality, still say "I am going to Genoa" and not "I am going downtown" to state their intention to go to the city center.

Historical development 
The aggregation of neighboring municipalities was in 1926, but the process started many years earlier.

Until 1874 the municipality of the city of Genoa was the same as the urban area surrounded by the 17th century city walls, divided into six districts, called "sestieri":

 Maddalena
 Molo
 
 Prè
 
 

The annexation of 1874 
After this first urban expansion it was necessary to find space for new facilities and residential neighborhoods for the middle classes.

In 1873 the mayor of Genoa  proposed a plan of territorial aggrandizement in the lower Val Bisagno, which was subsequently approved by a decree of King Vittorio Emanuele II which annexed six municipalities to Genoa on 1 January 1874:

 
 
 San Francesco d’Albaro

The annexation of 1926 
Great Genoa was completed in 1926 when 19 municipalities were annexed to Genoa. Among them, beside some small municipalities, were towns with a strong social identity such as Sampierdarena and Sestri Ponente. With this expansion the population of Genoa grew from 335,000 to 580,000 inhabitants.

Annexed municipalities

In the East:
 
 Nervi
 Quarto dei Mille
 
 

In the Bisagno valley:
 
 
 

In the Polcevera valley:
 Bolzaneto
 Borzoli
 Pontedecimo
 Rivarolo Ligure
 

In the West:
 Cornigliano Ligure
 Pegli
 
 Sampierdarena
 Sestri Ponente
 Voltri

References

External links
 Official Site of Municipality of Genoa

.
Genoa
History of Genoa
Ligurian Sea
Metropolitan City of Genoa